Fernando Vázquez (born 4 May 1971) is a Spanish racewalker. He competed in the men's 20 kilometres walk at the 1996 Summer Olympics.

References

1971 births
Living people
Athletes (track and field) at the 1996 Summer Olympics
Spanish male racewalkers
Olympic athletes of Spain
Place of birth missing (living people)